St Nicholas’ Church, Codsall is a Grade II* listed parish church in the Church of England in Codsall

History

The doorway is Norman. The west tower dates from the 14th century. The rest was built between 1846 and 1848 by architect Edward Banks. It comprises a 5 bay nave with aisles, south porch, north vestry, and west tower.

Memorials
Walter Wrottesley (d. 1630).

Organ

The church contains a pipe organ by Reginald Fisk of Wolverhampton and rebuilt by Hawkins in 1974. A specification of the organ can be found on the National Pipe Organ Register.

See also
Grade II* listed buildings in South Staffordshire
Listed buildings in Codsall

References

Church of England church buildings in Staffordshire
Churches completed in 1848
Grade II* listed churches in Staffordshire